G protein nucleolar 3 like is a protein that in humans is encoded by the GNL3L gene.

Function

The protein encoded by this gene appears to be a nucleolar GTPase that is essential for ribosomal pre-rRNA processing and cell proliferation. Two transcript variants encoding the same protein have been found for this gene.

References

Further reading